The Metropolitan Park Bathhouse and Pool Historic District, in Tucumcari in Quay County, New Mexico, was listed on the National Register of Historic Places in 1996.  The listing includes one contributing building, a contributing structure, and a contributing site.

It is a  parcel, which contains a bathhouse building, a swimming pool, and a landscaped park. The bathhouse, a one-story Spanish-Pueblo Revival style building, was built in 1940. The parcel has also been known locally as Five Mile Park and as the Apache Wells Lions Club Park.

The architect was Trent Thomas. He is also associated with:
Valmora Sanatorium Historic District, NM 97, 4 mi. E of jct. with Hwy. 161 NE of Watrous, New Mexico (Thomas, F. Trent)
Carlos Vierra House, 1002 Old Pecos Trail, Santa Fe, New Mexico (Thomas, Trent)

References

Historic districts on the National Register of Historic Places in New Mexico
Mission Revival architecture in New Mexico
Buildings and structures completed in 1940
Quay County, New Mexico
New Mexico State Register of Cultural Properties
Pueblo Revival architecture in New Mexico